Pisidium stewarti is a species of minute freshwater clam. It is an aquatic bivalve mollusc in the family Sphaeriidae, the fingernail clams and pea clams.

Distribution 
This minute clam, which is known in Europe as a decidedly Pleistocene glacial species, has also been identified as a Recent species in the Central Asian high mountainous massifs of Tien Shan, the Pamir Mountains and the Himalaya.

The recent distribution includes:
 Tibet, China

References
This article incorporates CC-BY-3.0 text from the reference

stewarti
Molluscs described in 1909